This is a list of members of the Chamber of Deputies of Luxembourg during the 2009–2013 legislature.  The Chamber of Deputies is Luxembourg's national legislature, and consists of sixty deputies.  They are elected once every five years. The members that served in the 2009–2013 legislature were elected in 2009.

The government during this legislature was the Juncker–Asselborn II Government, a coalition of CSV and LSAP.

Footnotes

References
 

Members of the Chamber of Deputies
Lists of members of the Chamber of Deputies (Luxembourg)